DXMJ-TV (channel 5) is a television station in Metro Davao, Philippines, serving as the Mindanao flagship of the GMA network. It is owned and operated by the network's namesake corporate parent alongside GTV outlet DXRA-TV (channel 27). Both stations share studios and transmitters at the GMA Complex, Broadcast Ave., Shrine Hills, Brgy. Matina Crossing, Davao City.

History

In 1965, DXSS-TV began broadcasting on channel 7. It was owned by the Southern Broadcasting Network and affiliated with the Republic Broadcasting System, GMA's predecessor, While followed by the establishment of provincial stations of ABS Channel 4 (owned by ABS-CBN's predecessor Alto Broadcasting System). DXSS-TV shut down on September 21, 1972, following the declaration of martial law by then-President Ferdinand Marcos by the virtue of Proclamation 1081.

In 1974, DXSS-TV returned to the air; the network also began its first local newscast of News at Seven Davao during the same year. It also launched its Cebuano drama series Goot da Wanderpol, which was syndicated from its co-owned station in Cebu from 1980 to 1985.

On April 30, 1992, following the network's expansion of coverage, DXSS-TV was integrated into the Rainbow Satellite Network nationwide satellite broadcast to bring live broadcasts of national and foreign programming from Manila-based DZBB-TV, the network's flagship TV station, to viewers in the Davao region, with added opt-outs to serve local audiences.

In late 1998, GMA acquired the channel 5 frequency, having transferred its transmitter from its original site in Tagum, Davao del Norte to Shrine Hills. Channel 5 relaunched as a GMA station with the call sign DXMJ-TV. A year later, GMA restored local programming with the return of a local newscast, known as Testigo: GMA Super Balita, covering the Davao City area. Also, GMA's television operation in Davao then moved to the Amesco Building, which had already been housing the GMA radio stations. It would remain there until relocating to Shrine Hills, Matina, in 2008.

GMA Davao started conducting digital test broadcasts on UHF channel 37 in 2018, covering Metro Davao and the provinces of Davao del Norte and Davao del Sur, as well as several parts of Davao de Oro.

Local programming
GMA Davao currently produces two news programs on weekdays that are broadcast throughout Mindanao: One Mindanao, a local evening newscast begun in 2017, and At Home with GMA Regional TV, a morning program started in 2020. In addition, GMA Davao produces annual coverage of the Kadayawan Festival.

Previous efforts at local news programming—morning show Una Ka BAI, the newscast 24 Oras Davao (previously Testigo), and a local edition of the Isyu Ngayon
news magazine—were scrapped in 2015 and 2016, respectively, as part of retrenchment in GMA's regional news operations. Biyaheng DO30, focused primarily on Davao city government issues. However, the program ended on December 25, 2022.

Digital television

Digital channels

Area of coverage

Primary areas 
 Davao City
 Davao del Sur
 Davao del Norte

Secondary areas 
 Davao Oriental
 Davao de Oro

Rebroadcasters

GMA Davao's programmings were seen in over fourteen relay/rebroadcasting stations in the whole Mindanao since 2017. Prior to its Davao-based satellite station, the General Santos station was previously operated as an originating station from 2010 to 2015, with its former programs Soccksargen Isyu Karon and Flash Bulletin until it was absorbed by GMA Davao which led to simulcast One Mindanao and other regional interstitial, as well as some of the editorial and reportorial staff are employed by the latter when GMA General Santos is not re-upgraded in the future. The Cagayan de Oro station was previously operated as an originating station from 2010 to 2015, with its former programs Northern Mindanao Isyu Karon and Testigo Northern Mindanao/24 Oras Northern Mindanao until it was absorbed by GMA Davao which led to simulcast One Mindanao and other regional interstitial, as well as some of the editorial and reportorial staff are employed by the latter. The Zamboanga, Sulu, Butuan, Kidapawan, Cotabato, Surigao and Tandag stations are formerly direct satellite stations to GMA-7 Manila before being reassigned as relays to GMA Davao since August 28, 2017. The Zamboanga station was later upgraded as a semi-satellite station for Western Mindanao as of October 14, 2021, along with General Santos station for South Central Mindanao as of March 21, 2022.

Personalities

Present 
Sarah Jane Hilomen-Velasco as Anchor and Senior Desk Manager of One Mindanao and the National Anchor of Regional TV News
Rgil Relator
Kent Abrigana
Jandi Esteban as Host and Regional Correspondent of At Home with GMA Regional TV.

Past 
 Temujin "Tek" Ocampo (now a Davao City Councilor and chairperson)
 Cherry Maning
 Real Sorroche (now with 97.9 XFM Davao)
 Jun Digamon (now with 91.5 Brigada News FM Davao)
 Vladimir Fernando
 Solomon Gonzales
 Brecil Kempis
 LJ Lindaan
 Derf Maiz
 Fem Nacario
 Richy Nalagon
 Julius Pacot (now with PTV-11 Davao)
 Jett Pogoy
 Sheryll Lou Pontillas
 Mariz Posadas (now with 91.5 Brigada News FM Davao)
 Antoinette Principe
 Jennifer Solis 
 Jan Bautista (now with 97.9 XFM Davao)
 Dotty Ibanez
 Madonna Timbal-Senajon (now with 97.9 XFM Davao)
 Leo Villareal
 Marlon Palma Gil
 Helen Quiñanola (now with ABS-CBN TFC News Australia) 
 Jesrel Himang (now with 105.5 Brigada News FM Trento)
 John Paul Seniel 
 Chynn Sabute 
 Sheillah Vergara-Rubio (now with 97.9 XFM Davao)

See also
DXRV
DXGM-AM
List of GMA Network stations

References

GMA Network stations
Digital television stations in the Philippines
Television stations in Davao City
Television channels and stations established in 1962